Evil or Divine – Live in New York City is a video album by the American heavy metal band Dio, recorded in New York City in 2002 and released on DVD in 2003. It was also released on CD as a live album in 2005.

DVD track listing
All lyrics by Ronnie James Dio, music as stated.

Bonus material:
Interview
Photo Gallery
Behind the Scenes Footage
Video for "Push"

Certifications

CD track listing

Charts

Band 
Ronnie James Dio - vocals
Doug Aldrich - guitar
Jimmy Bain - bass
Simon Wright - drums
Scott Warren - keyboards

References 

Dio (band) albums
2003 video albums
2005 live albums
Spitfire Records live albums
Eagle Rock Entertainment video albums
Live video albums